Archips eximius is a species of moth of the family Tortricidae. It is found in Yunnan, China.

References

External links
 

Moths described in 1984
Archips
Moths of Asia